The 2019 IHF Women's Super Globe was the first edition of the tournament. It was held in Wuxi, China from 1 to 4 August 2019.

1º de Agosto defeated China National Club in the final to win the inaugural event.

Teams

The winners of continental tournaments, two host teams and a wild card team participate.

Results
All times are local (UTC+8).

Bracket

5th place bracket

Quarterfinals

5–8th place semifinals

Semifinals

Seventh place game

Fifth place game

Third place game

Final

Final ranking

Top goalscorers

References

External links

2019 in women's handball
2019
2019 in Chinese sport
International handball competitions hosted by China
Handball in China
August 2019 sports events in China
Sport in Wuxi